Madame Curie was a Polish physicist and chemist.

Madame Curie may also refer to:
Madame Curie (film), a 1943 biographical film made by MGM
Madame Curie (opera), an opera by Elzbieta Sikora first performed 2011 at Unesco Paris.
Rue Madame Curie, a street in Beirut, Lebanon

See also
Marie Curie (disambiguation)